Dead Water is a detective novel by Ngaio Marsh; it is the twenty-third novel to feature Roderick Alleyn, and was first published in 1964.

The plot concerns a murder in a small coastal village, where a local spring believed to have miraculous healing properties is enriching many of the local residents who cater to those seeking healing they cannot find elsewhere.  Miss Emily Pride, an old teacher of Alleyn's, inherits the place from her sister and comes to inspect her new property with plans to stop what she considers to be the vulgar exploitation of gullible and desperate people. Miss Emily begins receiving anonymous threats, apparently from locals who are upset by the proposed interruption of their new-found prosperity. After Miss Emily is physically attacked, Alleyn arrives to protect his beloved old teacher but soon the situation escalates to murder.

Television adaptation  
This novel was adapted in 1994 for the television series The Inspector Alleyn Mysteries, with Patrick Malahide as Roderick Alleyn and Belinda Lang as Agatha Troy. The TV film relocated the novel's original Cornish setting to a Scottish island. Margaret Tyzack played Emily Pride and Jane Lapotaire Elspeth Cost.

External links
 

Roderick Alleyn novels
1964 British novels
Collins Crime Club books
Novels set in Cornwall
British detective novels